The 1913 LIHG Championship was the second congress of the LIHG Championships, an international ice hockey competition. The tournament was held from January 22–24, 1913, in St. Moritz, Switzerland. Germany won the championship, Great Britain finished second, and France finished third.

Results

Final Table

References

External links
 Tournament on hockeyarchives.info

LIHG Championship
LIHG
1913
January 1913 sports events